The 1972–73 Czechoslovak Extraliga season was the 30th season of the Czechoslovak Extraliga, the top level of ice hockey in Czechoslovakia. 10 teams participated in the league, and Tesla Pardubice won the championship.

Regular season

Playoffs

Semifinals 
 Tesla Pardubice – Slovan Bratislava 3:2 OT. (1:1 1:1 0:0 1:0)
 Tesla Pardubice – Slovan Bratislava 6:1 (1:1 3:0 2:0)
 Slovan Bratislava – Tesla Pardubice 2:1 (1:1 1:0 0:0)
 Slovan Bratislava – Tesla Pardubice 4:3 OT. (1:1 1:1 1:1 0:0 1:0)
 Tesla Pardubice – Slovan Bratislava 3:1 (1:0 1:1 1:0)
 Slovan Bratislava – Tesla Pardubice 2:3 OT. (1:1 1:0 0:1 0:1)
 Dukla Jihlava – SONP Kladno 3:0 (0:0 2:0 1:0)
 Dukla Jihlava – SONP Kladno 4:2 (2:2 1:0 1:0)
 SONP Kladno – Dukla Jihlava 4:7 (0:3 1:1 3:3)
 SONP Kladno – Dukla Jihlava 1:4 (0:2 1:1 0:1)

3rd place 
 SONP Kladno – Slovan Bratislava 7:2 (2:1 3:1 2:0)
 SONP Kladno – Slovan Bratislava 1:4 (1:1 0:2 0:1)
 Slovan Bratislava – SONP Kladno 1:3 (1:2 0:1 0:0)
 Slovan Bratislava – SONP Kladno 4:2 (2:1 0:0 2:1)
 Slovan Bratislava – SONP Kladno 5:4 OT (1:0 2:0 1:4 0:0 0:0 – 2:0)

Final 
 Tesla Pardubice – Dukla Jihlava 5:3 (2:1 1:0 2:2)
 Tesla Pardubice – Dukla Jihlava 3:0 (3:0 0:0 0:0)
 Dukla Jihlava – Tesla Pardubice 4:3 (1:1 2:1 1:1)
 Dukla Jihlava – Tesla Pardubice 7:0 (2:0 5:0 0:0)
 Tesla Pardubice – Dukla Jihlava 5:2 (2:0 1:1 2:1)
 Dukla Jihlava – Tesla Pardubice 3:5 (2:2 0:3 1:0)

1. Liga-Qualification

External links
History of Czechoslovak ice hockey

Czechoslovak Extraliga seasons
Czechoslovak
1972–73 in Czechoslovak ice hockey